The 1971 Philadelphia Phillies season was the 89th season for the franchise in Philadelphia. The Phillies finished in sixth place in the National League East, with a record of 67–95.

Offseason 
 October 7, 1970: Doc Edwards was released by the Phillies.
 November 3, 1970: Curt Flood and a player to be named later were traded by the Phillies to the Washington Senators for Greg Goossen, Jeff Terpko, and Gene Martin. The Phillies completed the trade by sending Terpko back to the Senators on April 10.
 December 16, 1970: Grant Jackson, Jim Hutto and Sam Parrilla were traded by the Phillies to the Baltimore Orioles for Roger Freed.

Regular season 
On April 10, the Phillies officially opened Veterans Stadium, their new home park, with a 4–1 victory over the Montreal Expos.

Harry Kalas was hired by the Phillies in 1971 to succeed Bill Campbell, and was the master of ceremonies at the 1971 opening of Veterans Stadium.

The Phillies played an exhibition game against the Reading Phillies on June 17, 1971, in Reading. The Phillies had signed second-round draft pick Mike Schmidt on June 11. Schmidt made his professional debut in the exhibition game in Reading. Schmidt played the whole game at shortstop for the Phillies and hit a game-winning home run against Reading. He was subsequently assigned to the Reading club, where he played the balance of the season.

On June 25, Pittsburgh Pirates outfielder Willie Stargell hit what wound up being the longest home run in Veterans Stadium history off of pitcher Jim Bunning in a 14–4 Pirates win over the Phillies.  The spot where the ball landed was marked with a yellow star with a black "S" inside a white circle until Stargell's 2001 death, when the white circle was painted black. The star remained until the stadium's 2004 demolition.

Season standings

Record vs. opponents

Notable transactions 
 April 22, 1971: Johnny Briggs was traded by the Phillies to the Milwaukee Brewers for Ray Peters and Pete Koegel.
 June 12, 1971: Tony Taylor was traded by the Phillies to the Detroit Tigers for Carl Cavanaugh (minors) and Mike Fremuth (minors).
 July 17, 1971: Jerry Martin was signed as an amateur free agent by the Phillies.

Draft picks 
 June 8, 1971: 1971 Major League Baseball Draft
Mike Schmidt was drafted by the Philadelphia Phillies in the 2nd round. Player signed June 11, 1971.
Dane Iorg was drafted by the Phillies in the 1st round (22nd pick) of the Secondary Phase. Player signed June 19, 1971.

Game log

|- style="background:#fbb"
| 1 || April 6 || @ Pirates || 2–4 || Dock Ellis (1–0) || Chris Short (0–1) || None || 39,712 || 0–1
|- style="background:#fbb"
| 2 || April 8 || @ Pirates || 0–2 || Luke Walker (1–0) || Woodie Fryman (0–1) || None || 12,289 || 0–2
|- style="background:#bfb"
| 3 || April 10 || Expos || 4–1 || Jim Bunning (1–0) || Bill Stoneman (0–1) || Joe Hoerner (1) || 55,352 || 1–2
|- style="background:#bfb"
| 4 || April 11 || Expos || 11–4 || Barry Lersch (1–0) || Carl Morton (0–2) || Bucky Brandon (1) || 12,431 || 2–2
|- style="background:#fbb"
| 5 || April 12 || Pirates || 3–4 (11) || Dave Giusti (1–0) || Dick Selma (0–1) || None || 19,469 || 2–3
|- style="background:#fbb"
| 6 || April 13 || Pirates || 3–9 || Nelson Briles (1–1) || Chris Short (0–2) || None || 14,934 || 2–4
|- style="background:#bfb"
| 7 || April 14 || Pirates || 6–5 || Joe Hoerner (1–0) || Mudcat Grant (0–1) || Dick Selma (1) || 8,379 || 3–4
|- style="background:#fbb"
| 8 || April 16 || Braves || 7–8 || Cecil Upshaw (3–0) || Jim Bunning (1–1) || None || 15,099 || 3–5
|- style="background:#fbb"
| 9 || April 17 || Braves || 2–6 || Ron Reed (2–1) || Barry Lersch (1–1) || None || 10,686 || 3–6
|- style="background:#fbb"
| 10 || April 18 || Braves || 4–5 (10) || Cecil Upshaw (4–0) || Woodie Fryman (0–2) || None || 29,583 || 3–7
|- style="background:#bfb"
| 11 || April 20 || @ Expos || 1–0 || Chris Short (1–2) || Ernie McAnally (0–1) || None || 11,634 || 4–7
|- style="background:#bbb"
| – || April 21 || @ Expos || colspan=6 | Postponed (rain); Makeup: September 20 as a traditional double-header
|- style="background:#fbb"
| 12 || April 22 || @ Cardinals || 2–5 || Steve Carlton (4–0) || Jim Bunning (1–2) || None || 8,411 || 4–8
|- style="background:#bfb"
| 13 || April 23 || @ Cardinals || 8–6 || Bucky Brandon (1–0) || George Brunet (0–1) || None || 29,290 || 5–8
|- style="background:#fbb"
| 14 || April 24 || @ Cardinals || 0–5 || Jerry Reuss (2–2) || Bill Champion (0–1) || None || 17,733 || 5–9
|- style="background:#fbb"
| 15 || April 25 || @ Cardinals || 4–5 || Frank Linzy (1–0) || Woodie Fryman (0–3) || None || 13,122 || 5–10
|- style="background:#bfb"
| 16 || April 26 || @ Astros || 2–1 || Rick Wise (1–0) || Tom Griffin (0–3) || None || 7,227 || 6–10
|- style="background:#fbb"
| 17 || April 27 || @ Astros || 0–1 || Larry Dierker (3–0) || Jim Bunning (1–3) || None || 8,152 || 6–11
|- style="background:#fbb"
| 18 || April 28 || @ Astros || 3–4 (10) || Jim Ray (1–1) || Bucky Brandon (1–1) || None || 8,576 || 6–12
|- style="background:#bfb"
| 19 || April 30 || @ Cubs || 1–0 || Chris Short (2–2) || Milt Pappas (3–2) || None || 9,110 || 7–12
|-

|- style="background:#fbb"
| 20 || May 1 || @ Cubs || 4–7 || Ferguson Jenkins (4–2) || Rick Wise (1–1) || None || 16,618 || 7–13
|- style="background:#fbb"
| 21 || May 2 || @ Cubs || 1–7 || Bill Hands (3–3) || Jim Bunning (1–4) || None || 9,585 || 7–14
|- style="background:#bfb"
| 22 || May 3 || Cardinals || 3–2 || Barry Lersch (2–1) || Chris Zachary (0–1) || Joe Hoerner (2) || 9,102 || 8–14
|- style="background:#fbb"
| 23 || May 4 || Cardinals || 3–7 || Jerry Reuss (3–3) || Chris Short (2–3) || None || 9,339 || 8–15
|- style="background:#fbb"
| 24 || May 5 || Cardinals || 1–5 || Reggie Cleveland (2–2) || Joe Hoerner (1–1) || None || 10,184 || 8–16
|- style="background:#bbb"
| – || May 6 || Cardinals || colspan=6 | Postponed (rain); Makeup: September 6 as a traditional double-header
|- style="background:#fbb"
| 25 || May 7 || Astros || 1–8 || Don Wilson (2–2) || Jim Bunning (1–5) || None || 15,728 || 8–17
|- style="background:#bbb"
| – || May 8 || Astros || colspan=6 | Postponed (rain); Makeup: July 27 as a traditional double-header
|- style="background:#bfb"
| 26 || May 9 || Astros || 2–1 || Barry Lersch (3–1) || Jack Billingham (2–2) || None || 36,145 || 9–17
|- style="background:#fbb"
| 27 || May 10 || Cubs || 0–3 || Ferguson Jenkins (6–2) || Chris Short (2–4) || None || 8,606 || 9–18
|- style="background:#fbb"
| 28 || May 11 || Cubs || 2–6 || Bill Hands (4–4) || Rick Wise (1–2) || None || 9,873 || 9–19
|- style="background:#fbb"
| 29 || May 12 || Cubs || 4–9 || Ken Holtzman (2–4) || Jim Bunning (1–6) || None || 8,518 || 9–20
|- style="background:#fbb"
| 30 || May 14 || @ Braves || 2–3 || Ron Reed (5–2) || Barry Lersch (3–2) || Cecil Upshaw (5) || 10,164 || 9–21
|- style="background:#fbb"
| 31 || May 15 || @ Braves || 2–6 || Phil Niekro (3–3) || Chris Short (2–5) || None || 4,976 || 9–22
|- style="background:#bfb"
| 32 || May 16 || @ Braves || 4–3 || Rick Wise (2–2) || Pat Jarvis (0–5) || Woodie Fryman (1) || 16,990 || 10–22
|- style="background:#bfb"
| 33 || May 17 || @ Reds || 3–2 || Jim Bunning (2–6) || Jim Merritt (0–5) || Bucky Brandon (2) || 7,089 || 11–22
|- style="background:#fbb"
| 34 || May 18 || @ Reds || 3–4 || Don Gullett (4–2) || Barry Lersch (3–3) || Joe Gibbon (3) || 7,399 || 11–23
|- style="background:#bfb"
| 35 || May 19 || Mets || 4–1 || Chris Short (3–5) || Jerry Koosman (3–2) || None || 19,159 || 12–23
|- style="background:#bfb"
| 36 || May 20 || Mets || 1–0 || Rick Wise (3–2) || Gary Gentry (3–4) || None || 14,619 || 13–23
|- style="background:#fbb"
| 37 || May 21 || Reds || 3–7 || Tony Cloninger (2–1) || Jim Bunning (2–7) || Wayne Granger (5) || 26,159 || 13–24
|- style="background:#bfb"
| 38 || May 22 || Reds || 5–3 || Barry Lersch (4–3) || Jim Merritt (0–6) || None || 31,628 || 14–24
|- style="background:#fbb"
| 39 || May 23 || Reds || 3–4 || Don Gullett (5–2) || Chris Short (3–6) || Clay Carroll (6) || 40,455 || 14–25
|- style="background:#bfb"
| 40 || May 24 || Reds || 2–1 || Rick Wise (4–2) || Gary Nolan (3–4) || None || 13,614 || 15–25
|- style="background:#fbb"
| 41 || May 25 || @ Mets || 4–5 (12) || Danny Frisella (2–1) || Jim Bunning (2–8) || None || 18,853 || 15–26
|- style="background:#bfb"
| 42 || May 26 || @ Mets || 3–2 (12) || Bucky Brandon (2–1) || Tug McGraw (3–2) || None || 22,409 || 16–26
|- style="background:#fbb"
| 43 || May 28 || @ Dodgers || 2–6 || Al Downing (4–2) || Chris Short (3–7) || None || 27,309 || 16–27
|- style="background:#fbb"
| 44 || May 29 || @ Dodgers || 3–9 || Bill Singer (3–9) || Rick Wise (4–3) || None || 35,843 || 16–28
|- style="background:#fbb"
| 45 || May 30 || @ Dodgers || 1–2 (12) || Jim Brewer (3–1) || Bucky Brandon (2–2) || None || 36,385 || 16–29
|- style="background:#bfb"
| 46 || May 31 (1) || @ Padres || 3–1 || Jim Bunning (3–8) || Al Severinsen (1–1) || Bucky Brandon (3) || see 2nd game || 17–29
|- style="background:#fbb"
| 47 || May 31 (2) || @ Padres || 3–6 || Bob Miller (2–1) || Barry Lersch (4–4) || None || 7,458 || 17–30
|-

|- style="background:#fbb"
| 48 || June 2 || @ Padres || 0–6 || Steve Arlin (2–7) || Rick Wise (4–4) || None || 2,425 || 17–31
|- style="background:#bfb"
| 49 || June 4 || @ Giants || 5–3 || Chris Short (4–7) || Gaylord Perry (6–3) || Jim Bunning (1) || 9,403 || 18–31
|- style="background:#bfb"
| 50 || June 5 || @ Giants || 5–3 || Joe Hoerner (2–1) || Jerry Johnson (6–2) || None || 10,945 || 19–31
|- style="background:#bfb"
| 51 || June 6 (1) || @ Giants || 1–0 || Rick Wise (5–4) || Steve Stone (4–4) || None || see 2nd game || 20–31
|- style="background:#fbb"
| 52 || June 6 (2) || @ Giants || 3–4 (12) || Rich Robertson (2–2) || Joe Hoerner (2–2) || None || 33,516 || 20–32
|- style="background:#fbb"
| 53 || June 8 || Dodgers || 2–4 || Bill Singer (4–9) || Chris Short (4–8) || Jim Brewer (5) || 21,388 || 20–33
|- style="background:#bfb"
| 54 || June 9 || Dodgers || 9–4 || Ken Reynolds (1–0) || Claude Osteen (6–4) || Woodie Fryman (2) || 19,004 || 21–33
|- style="background:#bfb"
| 55 || June 10 || Dodgers || 4–2 || Rick Wise (6–4) || Don Sutton (4–6) || None || 19,493 || 22–33
|- style="background:#fbb"
| 56 || June 11 || Padres || 1–2 || Dave Roberts (5–5) || Barry Lersch (4–5) || None || 19,260 || 22–34
|- style="background:#bfb"
| 57 || June 12 || Padres || 3–0 || Jim Bunning (4–8) || Steve Arlin (2–9) || Bucky Brandon (4) || 17,039 || 23–34
|- style="background:#fbb"
| 58 || June 13 || Padres || 8–9 || Bob Miller (3–1) || Bill Wilson (0–1) || Dick Kelley (1) || 35,343 || 23–35
|- style="background:#bfb"
| 59 || June 14 || Giants || 9–4 || Rick Wise (7–4) || Gaylord Perry (6–5) || None || 16,118 || 24–35
|- style="background:#fbb"
| 60 || June 15 || Giants || 0–6 || Ron Bryant (6–3) || Barry Lersch (4–6) || None || 21,588 || 24–36
|- style="background:#bfb"
| 61 || June 16 || Giants || 6–3 || Jim Bunning (5–8) || Steve Stone (4–5) || Joe Hoerner (3) || 27,212 || 25–36
|- style="background:#fbb"
| 62 || June 18 || @ Mets || 0–2 || Gary Gentry (6–4) || Ken Reynolds (1–1) || None || 45,428 || 25–37
|- style="background:#fbb"
| 63 || June 19 || @ Mets || 5–6 (15) || Danny Frisella (3–1) || Bill Wilson (0–2) || None || 52,171 || 25–38
|- style="background:#fbb"
| 64 || June 20 (1) || @ Mets || 6–7 || Tug McGraw (5–3) || Bucky Brandon (2–3) || None || see 2nd game || 25–39
|- style="background:#bfb"
| 65 || June 20 (2) || @ Mets || 9–7 (11) || Woodie Fryman (1–3) || Jim McAndrew (0–3) || None || 51,134 || 26–39
|- style="background:#bfb"
| 66 || June 21 || @ Reds || 5–3 (12) || Bucky Brandon (3–3) || Jim Merritt (0–9) || None || 11,683 || 27–39
|- style="background:#fbb"
| 67 || June 22 || @ Reds || 1–6 || Gary Nolan (5–7) || Ken Reynolds (1–2) || None || 13,226 || 27–40
|- style="background:#bfb"
| 68 || June 23 || @ Reds || 4–0 || Rick Wise (8–4) || Ross Grimsley (4–3) || None || 13,329 || 28–40
|- style="background:#bfb"
| 69 || June 24 || @ Reds || 3–1 (10) || Joe Hoerner (3–2) || Joe Gibbon (1–2) || None || 16,215 || 29–40
|- style="background:#fbb"
| 70 || June 25 || Pirates || 4–14 || Steve Blass (9–3) || Jim Bunning (5–9) || None || 38,736 || 29–41
|- style="background:#fbb"
| 71 || June 26 || Pirates || 9–11 || Dock Ellis (12–3) || Chris Short (4–9) || Dave Giusti (14) || 24,965 || 29–42
|- style="background:#bfb"
| 72 || June 27 (1) || Pirates || 8–4 || Woodie Fryman (2–3) || Bob Johnson (4–5) || Joe Hoerner (4) || see 2nd game || 30–42
|- style="background:#fbb"
| 73 || June 27 (2) || Pirates || 9–10 || Bob Veale (3–0) || Joe Hoerner (3–3) || Dave Giusti (15) || 37,062 || 30–43
|- style="background:#fbb"
| 74 || June 28 || @ Mets || 1–3 || Gary Gentry (7–5) || Rick Wise (8–5) || None || 24,151 || 30–44
|- style="background:#fbb"
| 75 || June 29 || @ Mets || 0–3 || Tom Seaver (10–3) || Barry Lersch (4–7) || None || 22,017 || 30–45
|- style="background:#bfb"
| 76 || June 30 || Reds || 7–4 || Bucky Brandon (4–3) || Joe Gibbon (1–3) || None || 17,578 || 31–45
|-

|- style="background:#fbb"
| 77 || July 1 || Reds || 1–5 || Jim McGlothlin (4–5) || Jim Bunning (5–10) || None || 15,586 || 31–46
|- style="background:#fbb"
| 78 || July 2 (1) || @ Expos || 2–4 || Dan McGinn (1–1) || Rick Wise (8–6) || None || see 2nd game || 31–47
|- style="background:#bfb"
| 79 || July 2 (2) || @ Expos || 8–4 || Woodie Fryman (3–3) || Bill Stoneman (9–8) || None || 22,210 || 32–47
|- style="background:#bfb"
| 80 || July 3 || @ Expos || 6–3 || Joe Hoerner (4–3) || Carl Morton (7–10) || None || 17,074 || 33–47
|- style="background:#bfb"
| 81 || July 4 || @ Expos || 10–6 || Chris Short (5–9) || Claude Raymond (1–6) || Bill Wilson (1) || 16,422 || 34–47
|- style="background:#bfb"
| 82 || July 5 || @ Braves || 6–5 || Woodie Fryman (4–3) || Bob Priddy (3–5) || Joe Hoerner (5) || 33,353 || 35–47
|- style="background:#fbb"
| 83 || July 6 || @ Braves || 2–5 || George Stone (2–3) || Rick Wise (8–7) || Cecil Upshaw (11) || 7,950 || 35–48
|- style="background:#fbb"
| 84 || July 7 || @ Braves || 2–4 || Ron Reed (9–6) || Barry Lersch (4–8) || None || 12,268 || 35–49
|- style="background:#bfb"
| 85 || July 8 || Expos || 7–5 || Bill Wilson (1–2) || Howie Reed (2–2) || None || 12,586 || 36–49
|- style="background:#fbb"
| 86 || July 9 || Expos || 0–3 || Steve Renko (8–9) || Chris Short (5–10) || None || 14,847 || 36–50
|- style="background:#bfb"
| 87 || July 10 (1) || Expos || 2–0 || Woodie Fryman (5–3) || John Strohmayer (2–2) || None || see 2nd game || 37–50
|- style="background:#bfb"
| 88 || July 10 (2) || Expos || 3–2 || Rick Wise (9–7) || Bill Stoneman (10–9) || None || 37,014 || 38–50
|- style="background:#bfb"
| 89 || July 11 || Expos || 11–5 || Bill Champion (1–1) || Dan McGinn (1–2) || Joe Hoerner (6) || 10,321 || 39–50
|- style="background:#bbcaff;"
| – || July 13 ||colspan="7" |1971 Major League Baseball All-Star Game at Tiger Stadium in Detroit
|- style="background:#fbb"
| 90 || July 15 || @ Cubs || 6–7 || Joe Decker (1–1) || Jim Bunning (5–11) || None || 26,346 || 39–51
|- style="background:#fbb"
| 91 || July 16 || @ Cubs || 2–11 || Ferguson Jenkins (14–8) || Chris Short (5–11) || None || 23,212 || 39–52
|- style="background:#bfb"
| 92 || July 17 || @ Cubs || 5–2 || Woodie Fryman (6–3) || Bill Hands (9–10) || Joe Hoerner (7) || 30,352 || 40–52
|- style="background:#bfb"
| 93 || July 18 (1) || @ Astros || 1–0 || Ken Reynolds (2–2) || Don Wilson (6–7) || None || see 2nd game || 41–52
|- style="background:#fbb"
| 94 || July 18 (2) || @ Astros || 7–10 || George Culver (4–6) || Jim Bunning (5–12) || None || 32,181 || 41–53
|- style="background:#fbb"
| 95 || July 19 || @ Astros || 2–3 (11) || Buddy Harris (1–0) || Bill Wilson (1–3) || None || 13,693 || 41–54
|- style="background:#bfb"
| 96 || July 20 || @ Cardinals || 5–1 || Chris Short (6–11) || Jerry Reuss (8–10) || None || 14,650 || 42–54
|- style="background:#fbb"
| 97 || July 21 || @ Cardinals || 1–6 || Reggie Cleveland (9–8) || Barry Lersch (4–9) || None || 16,200 || 42–55
|- style="background:#fbb"
| 98 || July 22 || @ Cardinals || 0–8 || Bob Gibson (7–9) || Woodie Fryman (6–4) || None || 20,547 || 42–56
|- style="background:#bfb"
| 99 || July 23 || Cubs || 4–3 || Ken Reynolds (3–2) || Ken Holtzman (9–11) || Bill Wilson (2) || 48,543 || 43–56
|- style="background:#fbb"
| 100 || July 24 || Cubs || 1–2 || Ferguson Jenkins (16–8) || Rick Wise (9–8) || None || 30,240 || 43–57
|- style="background:#bfb"
| 101 || July 25 || Cubs || 2–1 || Bill Wilson (2–3) || Bill Hands (9–11) || None || 19,572 || 44–57
|- style="background:#fbb"
| 102 || July 26 || Astros || 4–7 (15) || Jim Ray (7–2) || Bucky Brandon (4–4) || None || 10,848 || 44–58
|- style="background:#bfb"
| 103 || July 27 (1) || Astros || 8–3 || Woodie Fryman (7–4) || Larry Dierker (12–5) || None || see 2nd game || 45–58
|- style="background:#fbb"
| 104 || July 27 (2) || Astros || 1–5 || Wade Blasingame (7–8) || Ken Reynolds (3–3) || None || 20,779 || 45–59
|- style="background:#fbb"
| 105 || July 28 || Astros || 3–6 || Don Wilson (8–7) || Rick Wise (9–9) || None || 15,802 || 45–60
|- style="background:#fbb"
| 106 || July 30 || Cardinals || 3–4 || Bob Gibson (9–9) || Chris Short (6–12) || None || 26,461 || 45–61
|- style="background:#bfb"
| 107 || July 31 || Cardinals || 5–4 (16) || Bucky Brandon (5–4) || Moe Drabowsky (5–1) || None || 19,269 || 46–61
|-

|- style="background:#fbb"
| 108 || August 1 || Cardinals || 6–9 (13) || Stan Williams (4–4) || Manny Muñiz (0–1) || None || 22,432 || 46–62
|- style="background:#bfb"
| 109 || August 2 || Braves || 4–0 || Rick Wise (10–9) || George Stone (4–4) || None || 12,104 || 47–62
|- style="background:#bfb"
| 110 || August 3 || Braves || 3–2 || Chris Short (7–12) || Bob Priddy (4–9) || None || 17,703 || 48–62
|- style="background:#fbb"
| 111 || August 4 || Braves || 3–5 || Mike McQueen (3–1) || Bucky Brandon (5–5) || None || 19,086 || 48–63
|- style="background:#bfb"
| 112 || August 6 || @ Pirates || 3–2 || Bill Wilson (3–3) || Dock Ellis (15–6) || None || 21,323 || 49–63
|- style="background:#bfb"
| 113 || August 7 || @ Pirates || 5–3 || Rick Wise (11–9) || Bob Moose (7–7) || Bill Wilson (3) || 29,565 || 50–63
|- style="background:#bfb"
| 114 || August 8 (1) || @ Pirates || 3–2 || Woodie Fryman (8–4) || Steve Blass (11–5) || Joe Hoerner (8) || see 2nd game || 51–63
|- style="background:#fbb"
| 115 || August 8 (2) || @ Pirates || 0–4 || Bob Johnson (7–7) || Chris Short (7–13) || None || 31,448 || 51–64
|- style="background:#fbb"
| 116 || August 10 || @ Dodgers || 1–6 || Bill Singer (7–13) || Barry Lersch (4–10) || None || 26,508 || 51–65
|- style="background:#fbb"
| 117 || August 11 || @ Dodgers || 1–4 || Doyle Alexander (4–3) || Ken Reynolds (3–4) || None || 20,135 || 51–66
|- style="background:#bfb"
| 118 || August 12 || @ Dodgers || 3–1 (13) || Bucky Brandon (6–5) || Pete Mikkelsen (7–5) || None || 19,755 || 52–66
|- style="background:#bfb"
| 119 || August 13 || @ Padres || 5–2 || Rick Wise (12–9) || Fred Norman (2–9) || None || 4,006 || 53–66
|- style="background:#fbb"
| 120 || August 15 (1) || @ Padres || 4–5 || Dick Kelley (2–3) || Bill Wilson (3–4) || None || see 2nd game || 53–67
|- style="background:#fbb"
| 121 || August 15 (2) || @ Padres || 2–3 || Dave Roberts (11–12) || Barry Lersch (4–11) || None || 8,108 || 53–68
|- style="background:#fbb"
| 122 || August 17 || @ Giants || 1–5 || Gaylord Perry (13–9) || Ken Reynolds (3–5) || None || 8,973 || 53–69
|- style="background:#fbb"
| 123 || August 18 || @ Giants || 0–7 || John Cumberland (7–2) || Rick Wise (12–10) || None || 10,663 || 53–70
|- style="background:#fbb"
| 124 || August 20 || Dodgers || 5–9 || Pete Mikkelsen (8–5) || Chris Short (7–14) || Jim Brewer (15) || 30,006 || 53–71
|- style="background:#bfb"
| 125 || August 21 || Dodgers || 3–0 || Woodie Fryman (9–4) || Bill Singer (7–15) || None || 46,633 || 54–71
|- style="background:#bfb"
| 126 || August 22 || Dodgers || 3–2 || Ken Reynolds (4–5) || Claude Osteen (12–8) || Bill Wilson (4) || 26,403 || 55–71
|- style="background:#bfb"
| 127 || August 23 || Padres || 3–1 || Rick Wise (13–10) || Fred Norman (2–11) || None || 10,655 || 56–71
|- style="background:#fbb"
| 128 || August 24 || Padres || 0–2 || Ed Acosta (1–0) || Barry Lersch (4–12) || None || 10,688 || 56–72
|- style="background:#fbb"
| 129 || August 25 || Padres || 0–7 || Clay Kirby (12–10) || Bill Champion (1–2) || None || 10,696 || 56–73
|- style="background:#bbb"
| – || August 27 || Giants || colspan=6 | Postponed (rain); Makeup: August 28 as a traditional double-header
|- style="background:#fbb"
| 130 || August 28 (1) || Giants || 2–5 || Steve Hamilton (2–2) || Woodie Fryman (9–5) || Jerry Johnson (15) || see 2nd game || 56–74
|- style="background:#bfb"
| 131 || August 28 (2) || Giants || 7–3 || Rick Wise (14–10) || John Cumberland (7–3) || None || 33,012 || 57–74
|- style="background:#fbb"
| 132 || August 29 || Giants || 3–8 || Juan Marichal (14–9) || Ken Reynolds (4–6) || None || 26,825 || 57–75
|- style="background:#fbb"
| 133 || August 30 || @ Pirates || 4–6 || Luke Walker (6–8) || Bill Wilson (3–5) || Dave Giusti (28) || 13,399 || 57–76
|- style="background:#fbb"
| 134 || August 31 || @ Pirates || 5–7 || Bruce Kison (4–4) || Joe Hoerner (4–4) || Bob Miller (9) || 16,179 || 57–77
|-

|- style="background:#fbb"
| 135 || September 1 || @ Pirates || 7–10 || Luke Walker (7–8) || Bucky Brandon (6–6) || None || 11,278 || 57–78
|- style="background:#fbb"
| 136 || September 2 || Mets || 1–3 || Gary Gentry (11–9) || Rick Wise (14–11) || None || 17,110 || 57–79
|- style="background:#fbb"
| 137 || September 3 || Mets || 1–7 || Ray Sadecki (6–5) || Ken Reynolds (4–7) || None || 16,293 || 57–80
|- style="background:#fbb"
| 138 || September 4 (1) || Mets || 5–6 (10) || Tug McGraw (11–4) || Dick Selma (0–2) || None || see 2nd game || 57–81
|- style="background:#fbb"
| 139 || September 4 (2) || Mets || 0–3 || Jim McAndrew (1–5) || Barry Lersch (4–13) || Danny Frisella (9) || 25,560 || 57–82
|- style="background:#bfb"
| 140 || September 5 || Mets || 7–3 || Woodie Fryman (10–5) || Nolan Ryan (9–12) || Bill Wilson (5) || 16,886 || 58–82
|- style="background:#fbb"
| 141 || September 6 (1) || Cardinals || 3–6 || Bob Gibson (14–12) || Rick Wise (14–12) || None || see 2nd game || 58–83
|- style="background:#bfb"
| 142 || September 6 (2) || Cardinals || 2–1 || Bill Champion (2–2) || Chris Zachary (3–9) || Joe Hoerner (9) || 13,193 || 59–83
|- style="background:#fbb"
| 143 || September 7 || Cardinals || 5–7 (10) || Don Shaw (6–1) || Bill Wilson (3–6) || Al Santorini (2) || 9,339 || 59–84
|- style="background:#fbb"
| 144 || September 10 || @ Mets || 3–4 || Jerry Koosman (6–9) || Rick Wise (14–13) || Danny Frisella (10) || 25,437 || 59–85
|- style="background:#fbb"
| 145 || September 11 || @ Mets || 2–9 || Tom Seaver (18–8) || Woodie Fryman (10–6) || None || 19,508 || 59–86
|- style="background:#fbb"
| 146 || September 12 || @ Mets || 2–3 || Danny Frisella (7–4) || Joe Hoerner (4–5) || None || 16,704 || 59–87
|- style="background:#bfb"
| 147 || September 13 || @ Cardinals || 6–5 (10) || Bill Wilson (4–6) || Don Shaw (6–2) || None || 13,863 || 60–87
|- style="background:#bfb"
| 148 || September 14 || @ Cardinals || 5–4 || Rick Wise (15–13) || Chris Zachary (3–10) || Chris Short (1) || 10,640 || 61–87
|- style="background:#fbb"
| 149 || September 15 || Expos || 0–1 || Ernie McAnally (10–10) || Woodie Fryman (10–7) || None || 7,734 || 61–88
|- style="background:#fbb"
| 150 || September 16 || Expos || 2–6 || Steve Renko (15–14) || Bill Champion (2–3) || None || 5,893 || 61–89
|- style="background:#fbb"
| 151 || September 17 || Cubs || 3–4 || Joe Decker (3–1) || Ken Reynolds (4–8) || Larry Gura (1) || 13,644 || 61–90
|- style="background:#bfb"
| 152 || September 18 || Cubs || 4–3 (12) || Rick Wise (16–13) || Phil Regan (5–4) || None || 7,740 || 62–90
|- style="background:#fbb"
| 153 || September 19 || Cubs || 3–6 || Ferguson Jenkins (22–13) || Barry Lersch (4–14) || None || 20,815 || 62–91
|- style="background:#bbb"
| – || September 20 || @ Expos || colspan=6 | Postponed (rain); Makeup: September 21 as a traditional double-header
|- style="background:#bbb"
| – || September 20 || @ Expos || colspan=6 | Postponed (rain); Makeup: September 23
|- style="background:#bfb"
| 154 || September 21 (1) || @ Expos || 5–4 || Bill Champion (3–3) || Carl Morton (10–17) || Bill Wilson (6) || see 2nd game || 63–91
|- style="background:#fbb"
| 155 || September 21 (2) || @ Expos || 3–4 || Jim Britton (2–3) || Ken Reynolds (4–9) || Mike Marshall (23) || 14,963 || 63–92
|- style="background:#fbb"
| 156 || September 22 || @ Expos || 0–2 || Bill Stoneman (17–14) || Rick Wise (16–14) || None || 8,798 || 63–93
|- style="background:#bfb"
| 157 || September 23 || @ Expos || 6–4 || Wayne Twitchell (1–0) || Ernie McAnally (10–12) || Bill Wilson (7) || 6,786 || 64–93
|- style="background:#bfb"
| 158 || September 24 || @ Cubs || 6–1 || Barry Lersch (5–14) || Milt Pappas (17–14) || None || 2,183 || 65–93
|- style="background:#fbb"
| 159 || September 25 || @ Cubs || 2–4 || Ferguson Jenkins (23–13) || Bill Champion (3–4) || None || 8,891 || 65–94
|- style="background:#bfb"
| 160 || September 26 || @ Cubs || 5–1 || Ken Reynolds (5–9) || Joe Decker (3–2) || None || 18,505 || 66–94
|- style="background:#bfb"
| 161 || September 28 || Pirates || 6–3 || Rick Wise (17–14) || Dock Ellis (19–9) || None || 14,582 || 67–94
|- style="background:#fbb"
| 162 || September 30 || Pirates || 3–4 || Bob Moose (11–7) || Bill Champion' (3–5) || Dave Giusti (30) || 14,157 || 67–95
|-

| style="text-align:left;" |
The August 1, 1971, game was protested by the Cardinals in the top of the twelfth inning.The protest was later upheld, and the game was completed on September 7 (with new umpires).

 Roster 

 Player stats 

 Batting 

 Starters by position Note: Pos = Position; G = Games played; AB = At bats; H = Hits; Avg. = Batting average; HR = Home runs; RBI = Runs batted in Other batters Note: G = Games played; AB = At bats; H = Hits; Avg. = Batting average; HR = Home runs; RBI = Runs batted in Pitching 

 Starting pitchers Note: G = Games pitched; IP = Innings pitched; W = Wins; L = Losses; ERA = Earned run average; SO = Strikeouts Other pitchers Note: G = Games pitched; IP = Innings pitched; W = Wins; L = Losses; ERA = Earned run average; SO = Strikeouts Relief pitchers Note: G = Games pitched; W = Wins; L = Losses; SV = Saves; ERA = Earned run average; SO = Strikeouts''

Awards and honors

Records 
Terry Harmon, National League record, Most Chances Accepted in one nine-inning game (18 chances on June 12, 1971)

Farm system 

LEAGUE CHAMPIONS: Peninsula

Notes

Further reading

References 
1971 Philadelphia Phillies season at Baseball Reference

Philadelphia Phillies seasons
Philadelphia Phillies season
Philadelph